Corcelles is a former commune in the Ain department in eastern France. On 1 January 2016, it was merged into the new commune Champdor-Corcelles.

Geography
The river Albarine forms part of the commune's eastern border.

Population

See also
Communes of the Ain department

References

Former communes of Ain
Ain communes articles needing translation from French Wikipedia
Populated places disestablished in 2016